Full Steam Ahead is a command to move forward at maximum speed. It may also refer to:
Full Steam Ahead, an alternate title to 1936 British film Full Speed Ahead, directed by Lawrence Huntington
Full Steam Ahead, a 2016 British educational TV series starring Ruth Goodman, Alex Langlands, and Peter Ginn